Pieces of Nothing is the second EP and second release overall by American rock band Drowning Pool. It was released in 2000. All of the tracks, except for "Less Than Zero" would later be re-recorded and revamped for their debut studio album Sinner. In 2014, all the songs from the EP were remastered and released on the Unlucky 13th Anniversary deluxe edition of Sinner along with other unreleased songs and demos. The EP had a limited release and is out of print.

Track listing

Personnel
Drowning Pool
 Dave Williams – vocals
 Mike Luce – drums
 C. J. Pierce – guitar
 Stevie Benton – bass

References

2000 EPs
Drowning Pool albums
Nu metal EPs